Daniel Girardi (born April 29, 1984) is a Canadian former professional ice hockey defenceman. Undrafted, Girardi played 13 seasons in the National Hockey League (NHL) with the New York Rangers and Tampa Bay Lightning as a stay-at-home defenseman. He is currently a development coach for the Buffalo Sabres.

Playing career

Junior
During his junior career, he was a member of the London Knights team that won the 2005 OHL Championship and the 2005 Memorial Cup.He also played with the 2003 OHL champions Guelph Storm.

Professional
Although eligible in the 2003 NHL Entry Draft, Girardi went undrafted, as no NHL team felt he was a skilled enough player to play professionally, in spite of having a relatively good year in the Ontario Hockey League with 39 points in 68 games. Not to be discouraged, Girardi persevered and contacted several NHL teams for a tryout. The New York Rangers took a second look at Girardi and invited him to their training camp in the 2005–06 season. He eventually signed a free agent, two-way American Hockey League (AHL) contract with the Hartford Wolf Pack, the Rangers' AHL affiliate, and began the 2005–06 season with the Charlotte Checkers of the ECHL. Eventually, Girardi was called up to the AHL's Wolf Pack and while there, was signed to an NHL deal by the Rangers. Girardi was called up by the New York Rangers on January 27, 2007, after an injury to Rangers defenceman Darius Kasparaitis, and made his NHL debut that night in a 2–1 win over the Philadelphia Flyers. Girardi remained in the NHL for the remainder of the season, playing in 34 games and recording 6 assists. He also played in 10 playoff games, going pointless as the Rangers lost in the second round 4–2 to the Buffalo Sabres.

On February 16, 2008, Girardi signed a two-year, $3.1 million contract extension with the Rangers.

On July 9, 2010, Girardi re-signed with the Rangers, signing a four-year, $13.3 million deal. During the 2010–11 season, Girardi led the NHL in blocked shots, with 236.

For the 2011–12 season, Girardi was named an interim alternate captain for the Rangers while Marc Staal was recovering from post-concussion syndrome. In Staal's absence, Girardi led all NHL skaters in average ice-time, averaging nearly 28 minutes per game. His play earned him a spot in the 2012 NHL All-Star Game. Girardi scored his first playoff goal on April 26, 2012, against the Ottawa Senators during Game 7 of the 2012 Eastern Conference Quarterfinals.

During the 2012–13 lockout-shortened season, Girardi was named an interim alternate captain for the Rangers a second time while Marc Staal was recovering from an injury sustained on March 3 when he was hit with a puck in the eye.

During the 2013–14 season, on February 28, Girardi signed a six-year, $33 million extension with the Rangers. He was named an alternate captain for the Rangers for the remainder of the season when captain Ryan Callahan was traded at the NHL trade deadline to the Tampa Bay Lightning. Girardi's solid defensive play in the playoffs was a key part in the Rangers' run to the 2014 Stanley Cup Finals, where they lost to the Los Angeles Kings.

Girardi became a permanent alternate captain during the 2014–15 season, and spent most of the season on the Rangers' top defensive pairing with captain Ryan McDonagh. Girardi's solid defensive play that season led to the Rangers winning the Presidents' Trophy, as well as a run to the Eastern Conference Final, where the Rangers lost to the Tampa Bay Lightning in a hard-fought, 7-game series.

Girardi started the 2015–16 season strong, contributing to a 14–2–2 start to the 2015–16 season for the Rangers. Midway through the season, however, the Rangers slumped, going 4–7–2 in the month of December, with many critics blaming Girardi for the slump. Even though the Rangers seemed to play better by February, Girardi suffered a knee injury late in the season, and the team started to fall apart, losing to the Pittsburgh Penguins in the first round of the playoffs in five games, despite many expecting the Rangers to make another deep playoff run.

Following the 2016–17 season, his 11th with the Rangers, due to a decline in play and salary cap considerations it was announced that Girardi would be bought out from the remaining three years of his contract on June 14, 2017. On July 1, 2017, Girardi signed as a free agent a two-year, $6 million deal with the Tampa Bay Lightning. The Lightning announced through its social media account that Girardi would be wearing the #5, which was a continuation of the number he used as a member of the Rangers.

In game 4 of the second round in the 2018 NHL playoffs, Girardi scored an overtime goal to give the Lightning the win and a 3–1 series lead over the Boston Bruins.

Girardi announced his retirement from hockey on September 20, 2019. Girardi retired 30th in playoff games played by a defenceman, and as the all-time leader in shots blocked, having blocked nearly 2,000 shots in his career (the league did not begin tracking blocked shots until 2005).

Personal life
Girardi's childhood idol was Mark Messier. During the off-season, Girardi resides in Fort Erie, Ontario.

Girardi and his wife Pam have two children together – a son and a daughter. Girardi and his family live in Davis Islands neighborhood of Tampa, Florida.

Career statistics

Awards
2012 NHL All-Star

References

External links
 

1984 births
Living people
Barrie Colts players
Canadian ice hockey defencemen
Canadian people of Italian descent
Charlotte Checkers (1993–2010) players
Guelph Storm players
Hartford Wolf Pack players
Ice hockey people from Ontario
London Knights players
National Hockey League All-Stars
New York Rangers players
Sportspeople from Welland
Tampa Bay Lightning players
Undrafted National Hockey League players